Lists of mosques cover mosques, places of worship for Muslims. The lists include the most famous, largest and oldest mosques, and mosques mentioned in the Quran, as well as lists of mosques in each region and country of the world. The major regions, Africa, Americas, Asia, Europe and Oceania are sorted alphabetically.
The sub-regions, such as Northeast and Northwest Africa in Africa, and Arabia and South Asia in Asia, are sorted by the dates in which their first mosques were reportedly established, more or less, barring those that are mentioned by name in the Quran.

General
 List of mosques, a selection of mosques among the most famous, worldwide
 List of largest mosques
 List of the oldest mosques
 Mentioned in the Quran

Asia
List of mosques in Asia
List of mosques in the Arab League
List of mosques in Afghanistan
List of mosques in Bangladesh
List of mosques in China
List of mosques in Hong Kong
List of mosques in Macau
List of mosques in India
List of mosques in Kerala
List of mosques in Indonesia
Indonesian mosques	
List of mosques in Iran
List of mosques in Iraq	
List of mosques in Israel
List of mosques in Japan
List of mosques in Kuwait
List of mosques in Malaysia
List of mosques in Pakistan
List of mosques in Palestine
List of mosques in the Philippines
List of mosques in Saudi Arabia	
List of mosques in Singapore
List of mosques in Syria
List of mosques in Taiwan
List of mosques in Tajikistan
List of mosques in Thailand
List of mosques in Turkey
List of mosques in the United Arab Emirates

Western Asia

Arabian Peninsula

Levant & Fertile Crescent

Anatolia

Iranian Plateau

Transcaucasia

Central Asia

South Asia

Southeast Asia

East Asia

Africa
List of mosques in Africa
List of mosques in Algeria
List of mosques in Egypt
List of mosques in Morocco

Northeast Africa

Northwest Africa

Southeast Africa
This grouping includes nearby islands of the Indian Ocean, but excludes countries that are also in Southern Africa.

Western-Central Africa

Southern Africa

West Africa

Americas 

List of mosques in the Americas
List of mosques in the United States
List of mosques in Canada
List of mosques in Ottawa–Gatineau
List of mosques in Mexico
List of mosques in Brazil

South America

North America
This grouping includes Central America and island-states of the Caribbean Sea.

Europe
List of mosques in Europe
List of mosques in Albania
List of mosques in Bulgaria
List of mosques in Cyprus
List of mosques in France	
List of mosques in Germany
List of mosques in Georgia
List of mosques in Hungary
List of mosques in the Netherlands
List of mosques in Russia
List of mosques in Scandinavia (Denmark, Sweden, and Norway)
List of mosques in Turkey
List of mosques in the United Kingdom

British Isles

Western Europe

Iberian Peninsula

Russia

Eastern Europe

Nordic countries

Oceania 

List of mosques in Oceania
List of mosques in Australia

Australasia

Melanesia

Notes

References

See also 
 Holiest sites in Islam